The Jharkhand High Court is one of the newest high courts in India. It was established in 2000. The court has jurisdiction over Jharkhand state.

The seat of the court is at Ranchi, the administrative capital of the state. The court has a sanctioned judge strength of 25. The new building of the Jharkhand High Court has been approved. A 165-acre land has been granted near the HEC Industrial Complex, which will be used for the development of the high court, a residential complex for judges and lawyers chambers. The estimated cost for the project is around Rs. 460 Crores. The complex will also have an auditorium with a 1000-seat capacity, four conference rooms, eight committee meeting halls, separate building for advocate general and government pleader. The Jharkhand High Court started live proceedings of virtual hearings on YouTube on 15 December 2021. The Jharkhand High Court became sixth in the country to start live streaming of hearings on YouTube.

History
A circuit bench of the Patna High Court was established at Ranchi on 6 March 1972 under clause 36 of the letters patent of the Patna High Court. The circuit bench became the permanent bench of the Patna High Court, by the High Court at Patna (Establishment of Permanent Bench at Ranchi) Act 1976 (Act 57 of 1976) on 8 April 1976. This permanent bench finally became the Jharkhand High Court on reorganisation of Bihar state on 15 November 2000.

Chief Justice
Sanjaya Kumar Mishra is the chief justice of the Jharkhand High Court since 20 February 2023.

Former chief justices

References

 Jurisdiction and Seats of Indian High Courts
  Judge strength in High Courts increased

External links
 The Jharkhand High Court website

Government of Jharkhand
2000 establishments in Jharkhand
Courts and tribunals established in 2000